Dafydd Llywelyn (born November 1976) is a Welsh Plaid Cymru politician. Since May 2016, he has served as the Dyfed-Powys Police and Crime Commissioner.

Career

Early career
Llywelyn started his working life as a procurement officer for SONY Manufacturing UK. In 2001, he joined Dyfed–Powys Police as a management information officer. He moved to the Criminal Investigation Department as an analyst in 2002, and was promoted to chief analyst in 2007. In September 2014, he was appointed a lecturer and teaching fellow in criminology at Aberystwyth University. This appointment came through the Coleg Cymraeg Cenedlaethol (the Welsh National College) which aims to increase courses taught in the Welsh-language at universities in Wales.

Political career

In October 2015, it was announced that Llywelyn would be standing as the Plaid Cymru candidate for the Dyfed-Powys Police and Crime Commissioner (PCC) at the 2016 election. On 6 May 2016, he was elected PCC with a total of 75,158 votes (52,469 in the 1st round, plus 22,689 in the 2nd). The turnout was 49.1%, a significant increase from the 15.7% turnout at the 2012 election.

References

1976 births
Living people
Plaid Cymru police and crime commissioners
Police and crime commissioners in Wales
Academics of Aberystwyth University
Welsh-speaking politicians